Verónica Cepede Royg (born 21 January 1992) is a professional Paraguayan tennis player.

On 7 August 2017, she reached her highest WTA singles ranking of No. 73 whilst her best doubles ranking is No. 85, achieved on 19 September 2016. Cepede Royg has won one doubles title on the WTA Tour, one WTA 125 doubles title, and 14 singles titles and 20 doubles titles on ITF tournaments. Playing for the Paraguay Fed Cup team, Cepede Royg has a win–loss record of 61–26. She participated in the 2012 London Olympics, losing in the opening round to American Varvara Lepchenko in three sets, as well as the 2016 Rio Olympics and 2020 Tokyo Olympics. Her best performance at a Grand Slam championship was reaching the fourth round of the 2017 French Open.

Personal life and background
Her father, Eduardo, owns gas station, while her mother, Edith, is retired dentist. Her brother named Andres is economist and one sister, Estefania, is architect. She was introduced to tennis at age five by siblings. She stated that her favorite shot is forehand, her favorite tournament is Roland Garros, while her favorite surface is clay. Her tennis idols growing up were Roger Federer and Kim Clijsters. If Cepede Royg hadn't been a tennis player, she would have become a nutritionist.

Performance timelines

Only main-draw results in WTA Tour, Grand Slam tournaments, Fed Cup/Billie Jean King Cup, and Olympic Games are included in win–loss records.

Singles
Current through the 2022 Australian Open.

Doubles
This table is current through 2020 Fed Cup.

WTA career finals

Doubles: 3 (1 title, 2 runner-ups)

WTA 125 tournament finals

Doubles: 1 (1 title)

ITF Circuit finals

Singles: 28 (14 titles, 14 runner–ups)

Doubles: 33 (20 titles, 13 runner–ups)

Notes

References

External links

 
 
 

1992 births
Living people
Sportspeople from Asunción
Paraguayan female tennis players
Tennis players at the 2010 Summer Youth Olympics
Tennis players at the 2012 Summer Olympics
Tennis players at the 2016 Summer Olympics
Olympic tennis players of Paraguay
Tennis players at the 2015 Pan American Games
Pan American Games bronze medalists for Paraguay
Tennis players at the 2011 Pan American Games
Pan American Games medalists in tennis
South American Games silver medalists for Paraguay
South American Games medalists in tennis
Competitors at the 2010 South American Games
Competitors at the 2014 South American Games
Tennis players at the 2019 Pan American Games
Tennis players at the 2007 Pan American Games
Medalists at the 2015 Pan American Games
Medalists at the 2019 Pan American Games
Tennis players at the 2020 Summer Olympics
20th-century Paraguayan women
21st-century Paraguayan women